The 2020 NBA draft was held on November 18, 2020. The draft was originally scheduled to be held at Barclays Center in Brooklyn on June 25, but due to the ongoing COVID-19 pandemic, it was instead conducted at ESPN's facilities in Bristol, Connecticut, with the event held via videoconferencing. National Basketball Association (NBA) teams took turns selecting amateur United States college basketball players and other eligible players, including international players. It was televised nationally on ESPN. The draft lottery was originally scheduled to take place on May 19, 2020, it was rescheduled on August 20, 2020. This was the first draft since 1975 to not be held in June and was also the second to be done later than that month after the inaugural 1947 draft, which was conducted in July by the NBA's predecessor, the Basketball Association of America (BAA). The first pick was made by the Minnesota Timberwolves, who selected Anthony Edwards out of Georgia.

Draft selections

Notable undrafted players

These players were not selected in the 2020 NBA draft, but have played at least one regular season or postseason game in the NBA.

Trades involving draft picks

Pre-draft trades
Prior to the day of the draft, the following trades were made and resulted in exchanges of draft picks between the teams.

Draft-day trades
Draft-day trades will be made on the day of the draft.

Combine
Due to the ongoing COVID-19 pandemic that started earlier in the year, the invitation-only NBA Draft Combine and the event's on-court elements was held in multiple phases, lasting from September 28 until November 16, two days before the draft began. For the first part, players began their league and team interviews via videoconference feeds, similar to this year's draft lottery. This segment lasted from September 28 until October 16. Then, in the second part, players began their individual, on-court programs at the NBA team facility nearest the player's home or interim residence instead of at one standardized area. While players were allowed to continue working out on their own even back in September 2020, this section lasted from October 16 until November 16. This program included strength and agility tests, anthropometric measurements, shooting drills, medical testing and examinations, and a "Pro Day" video filmed via HomeCourt, a mobile basketball training application. The NBA also expanded their Combine HQ tool for this period. While the NBA disallowed their own staff members to be involved with these workouts in person (either in the team's own practice facilities or nearby the player himself) at first, they eventually relaxed some of these restrictions to include up to three team executives meeting with a player they're interested in personally, as well as allowed a player to workout with multiple teams at the same time in their own towns. The NBA also gave a limit of 10 meetings total with the candidates there, with any extra meetings with someone cutting into their amount allowed for this year.

At the start of this year's draft combine, only 60 prospects were confirmed to participate in this event. The top, headlining prospect involved with this combine is LaMelo Ball, an automatically eligible draft prospect that gained fame as a professional player both nationally and overseas years earlier after skipping his junior year of high school and was a top-3 selection for the draft. In addition to him, R. J. Hampton was also invited as an automatically eligible draft prospect for this year, both representing Australia's NBL as outsider Rising Stars for different teams. Other notable invites include five fully international prospects (Deni Avdija, Killian Hayes, Théo Maledon, Paul Eboua, and Karim Mané, the last of whom played in a Canadian CEGEP), two high school postgraduates (Kenyon Martin Jr. and Josh Hall), and Jay Scrubb, a junior college prospect. Like with prior years, players still held the option to either sit out the combine or have only limited participation there, such as with LaMelo Ball doing interviews with teams only. For the first half of the combine, each participant was given a standard set of 10 questions to answer in front of each team asking them, as well as league officials under a half-hour setting, with players being allowed to interview as many teams as possible. In the second half of the combine, teams were allowed to meet with any candidate that had mutual interest in them back, though each team had a set limit of meetings with players in mind before the draft began. These meetings with players allowed teams to properly gauge each player to the best of their abilities during this time.

Draft lottery

The NBA draft lottery is held annually to determine the draft order for the teams that did not make the playoffs in the preceding season. Every NBA team that missed the NBA playoffs holds a chance at winning a top-four pick, but teams with worse records have a better chance at winning a top-four pick, effective as of the 2019 draft. After the lottery selects the teams that receive a top-four pick, the other teams receive an NBA draft pick based on their winning percentage from the prior season. As it is commonplace in the event of identical win–loss records, the NBA performs a random drawing to break ties for not just lottery teams, but also for playoff teams with equal records. This year, the Sacramento Kings won a tiebreaker for the draft lottery over the New Orleans Pelicans despite having a better overall record to conclude the regular season, bubble games included.

The lottery was originally scheduled to take place on May 19 at the United Center in Chicago, Illinois, but was postponed due to the COVID-19 pandemic and the length of the 2019–20 season's suspension. On July 21, 2020, the lottery was rescheduled for August 20. The lottery teams included the eight teams that did not play in the resumed 2019–20 NBA season in July and August: the Golden State Warriors, Cleveland Cavaliers, Minnesota Timberwolves, Atlanta Hawks, Detroit Pistons, New York Knicks, Chicago Bulls, and Charlotte Hornets. They also included the other six teams that missed the playoffs in the resumed season: the Washington Wizards, Phoenix Suns, San Antonio Spurs, Sacramento Kings, New Orleans Pelicans, and Memphis Grizzlies, with seeding completely based on the teams' records from March 12, 2020. The new lottery still took place in the United Center, but all guests representing the teams in the lottery attended virtually instead through video communication feeds. This year, two of the bottom three teams (Minnesota and Golden State) received the top two selections, while Charlotte and Chicago both jumped up into the top four. Teams that resumed their seasons remained at their initial positions set at the time, with Memphis moving down to the 14th selection after initially being set for a playoff spot.

Eligibility and entrants

The draft is conducted under the eligibility rules established in the league's 2017 collective bargaining agreement (CBA) with its player's union. The previous CBA that ended the 2011 lockout instituted no immediate changes to the draft, but called for a committee of owners and players to discuss future changes.

All drafted players must be at least 19 years old during the calendar year of the draft. In terms of dates, players who are eligible for the 2020 draft must be born on or before December 31, 2001.
Since the 2016 draft, the following rules, as implemented by the NCAA Division I council for that division, are:
Declaration for the draft no longer results in automatic loss of college eligibility. As long as a player does not sign a contract with a professional team outside the NBA, or sign with an agent, he retains college eligibility as long as he makes a timely withdrawal from the draft.
NCAA players now have until 10 days after the end of the NBA Draft Combine to withdraw from the draft. Since the combine is held in mid-May, the current deadline is about five weeks after the previous mid-April deadline.
NCAA players may participate in the draft combine, and are allowed to attend one tryout per year with each NBA team without losing college eligibility.
NCAA players may now enter and withdraw from the draft up to two times without loss of eligibility. Previously, the NCAA treated a second declaration of draft eligibility as a permanent loss of college eligibility.

The NBA has since expanded the draft combine to include players with remaining college eligibility (who, like players without college eligibility, can only attend by invitation).

Early entrants
Players who are not automatically eligible have to declare their eligibility for the draft by notifying the NBA offices in writing no later than at least 60 days before the event. For the 2020 draft, the date fell on April 26 at first, but the deadline was postponed indefinitely and moved to August 17. After that date, "early entry" players are able to attend NBA pre-draft camps and individual team workouts to show off their skills and obtain feedback regarding their draft positions. Under the CBA a player may withdraw his name from consideration from the draft at any time before the final declaration date, which is 10 days before. Under current NCAA rules, players have until 10 days after the draft combine to withdraw from the draft and retain college eligibility; however, due to COVID-19 disruptions, the NCAA announced that for the 2020 draft, the withdrawal deadline would be changed to 10 days after the combine or August 3, whichever came first.

A player who has hired an agent retains his remaining college eligibility regardless of whether he is drafted after an evaluation from the NBA Undergraduate Advisory Committee. Underclassmen who declare for the NBA draft and are not selected have the opportunity to return to their school for at least another year only after terminating all agreements with their agents, who must have been certified no later than August 1, 2020.

College underclassmen
This year, 205 underclassed draft prospects (i.e., players with remaining college eligibility) had declared by the initial April 26 deadline, with 163 of these players being from college or were high school postgraduates. The names left over mean they have hired an agent, or have announced that they plan to do so before the night of the draft. At the end of either the August 3 deadline (or the other one which was 10 days post-combine), 71 players declared their intentions to enter the draft with an agent, while 92 announced their return to college for at least one more season (or enter college in the case of Makur Maker). Additionally, one more academy postgraduate student managed to enter at the new underclassman deadline. Furthermore, three different underclassmen that were confirmed at the time (Jermaine Bishop, Isiaha Mike, and Filip Petrušev) all signed overseas contracts in Europe while waiting for this year's draft to begin, though they still remained listed under their colleges they played for before beginning the draft process as opposed to the new teams and leagues they signed for; Petrušev later withdrew from the draft on November 8, 2020 to stay with his new team, the Mega Soccerbet in Serbia, initially leaving the final number of underclassmen students entering the draft at 71 (69 excluding Bishop and Mike). Finally, at the November 8 deadline, Tony Goodwin II also withdrew his name from the draft, but Nikolaos Okekuoyen (a Greek-Nigerian postgraduate student from Ridgeview Prep) was approved for the draft that day, leaving the number of players still at 71.

  Precious Achiuwa – F, Memphis (freshman)
  Milan Acquaah – G, California Baptist (junior)
  Ty-Shon Alexander – G, Creighton (junior)
  Cole Anthony – G, UNC (freshman)
  Brendan Bailey – F, Marquette (sophomore)
  Saddiq Bey – F, Villanova (sophomore)
  Tyler Bey – G, Colorado (junior)
  Jermaine Bishop – G, Norfolk State (junior)
  Dachon Burke Jr. – G, Nebraska (junior)
  Vernon Carey Jr. – F, Duke (freshman)
  Nate Darling – G, Delaware (junior)
  Lamine Diane – F, Cal State Northridge (sophomore)
  Devon Dotson – G, Kansas (sophomore)
  Anthony Edwards – G, Georgia (freshman)
  C. J. Elleby – F, Washington State (sophomore)
  Malik Fitts – F, Saint Mary's (junior)
  Malachi Flynn – G, San Diego State (junior)
  Josh Green – G, Arizona (freshman)
  Ashton Hagans – G, Kentucky (sophomore)
  Tyrese Haliburton – G, Iowa State (sophomore)
  Josh Hall – F, Moravian Prep (Hudson, NC; postgraduate)
  Rayshaun Hammonds – F, Georgia (junior)
  Jalen Harris – G, Nevada (junior)
  Niven Hart – G, Fresno State (freshman)
  Nate Hinton – G, Houston (sophomore)
  Elijah Hughes – F, Syracuse (junior)
  Isaiah Joe – G, Arkansas (sophomore)
  Dakari Johnson – G, Cape Fear CC (freshman)
  C. J. Jones – G, Middle Tennessee (junior)
  Mason Jones – G, Arkansas (junior)
  Tre Jones – G, Duke (sophomore)
  Saben Lee – G, Vanderbilt (junior)
  Micheal Lenoir – G, Creating Young Minds Academy (Irving, TX; postgraduate)
  Kira Lewis – G, Alabama (sophomore)
 / Nico Mannion – G, Arizona (freshman)
  Naji Marshall – F, Xavier (junior)
  Kenyon Martin Jr. – G, IMG Academy (Bradenton, FL; postgraduate)
  Tyrese Maxey – G, Kentucky (freshman)
  Jaden McDaniels – F, Washington (freshman)
  Isiaha Mike – F, SMU (junior)
  E. J. Montgomery – F, Kentucky (sophomore)
  Aaron Nesmith – G, Vanderbilt (sophomore)
  Zeke Nnaji – F, Arizona (freshman)
 / Jordan Nwora – F, Louisville (junior)
 / Nikolaos Okekuoyen – C, Ridgeview Prep (Hickory, NC; postgraduate)
  Onyeka Okongwu – F, USC (freshman)
  Isaac Okoro – F, Auburn (freshman)
  Daniel Oturu – C, Minnesota (sophomore)
  Reggie Perry – F, Mississippi State (sophomore)
  Nate Pierre-Louis – G, Temple (junior)
  Immanuel Quickley – G, Kentucky (sophomore)
  Jahmi'us Ramsey – G, Texas Tech (freshman)
  Paul Reed – F, DePaul (junior)
  Nick Richards – C, Kentucky (junior)
  Jay Scrubb – G, John A. Logan College (sophomore)
  Jalen Smith – F, Maryland (sophomore)
  Cassius Stanley – G, Duke (freshman)
  Isaiah Stewart – F, Washington (freshman)
  Tyrell Terry – G, Stanford (freshman)
  Xavier Tillman – C, Michigan State (junior)
  Obi Toppin – F, Dayton (sophomore)
  Jordan Tucker – F, Butler (junior)
  Devin Vassell – G, Florida State (sophomore)
  Matthew Walker – G, Michigan State (postgraduate - Dual JD)
  Nick Weatherspoon – G, Mississippi State (junior)
  Kaleb Wesson – F, Ohio State (junior)
  Kahlil Whitney – F, Kentucky (freshman)
  Emmitt Williams – F, LSU (sophomore)
  Patrick Williams – F, Florida State (freshman)
  James Wiseman – C, Memphis (freshman)
  Robert Woodard II – F, Mississippi State (sophomore)
  Ömer Yurtseven – C, Georgetown (junior)

International players
International players that declared this year and did not previously declare in another prior year can drop out about 10 days before the 2020 draft, which was November 8 this year. By the initial April 26 deadline, 42 international prospects, including one from a Canadian CEGEP (Quebecer college), expressed interest in this draft. By the end of the deadline set in August, seven of these players pulled their names out, leaving only 35 prospects, later adding one more player from a Canadian preparatory academy who also entered at that deadline. With Sergi Martínez & Joel Parra also dropping out of the draft before the draft deadline concluded, but after the official announcement came out, this officially brought the final number of underclassmen available down to 84 players instead of 86, with 23 international players exiting the draft by November this year instead of 21.

 / Deni Avdija – F, Maccabi Tel Aviv (Israel)
  Adrian Bogucki – C, Anwil Włocławek (Poland)
 / Leandro Bolmaro – G, FC Barcelona (Spain)
  Imru Duke – F, CB Peñas Huesca (Spain)
 / Paul Eboua – F, Stella Azzurra Roma (Italy)
  Killian Hayes – G, ratiopharm Ulm (Germany)
  Vít Krejčí – G, Casademont Zaragoza (Spain)
  Yam Madar – G, Hapoel Tel Aviv (Israel)
  Théo Maledon – G, ASVEL (France)
  Karim Mané – G, Vanier College (QC, Canada)
  Aleksej Pokuševski – F, Olympiacos Pireaus (Greece)
  Marko Simonović – C, Mega Soccerbet (Serbia)
  Mouhamed Thiam – C, Nanterre 92 (France)

Automatically eligible entrants
Players who do not meet the criteria for "international" players are automatically eligible if they meet any of the following criteria:
They have completed four years of their college eligibility.
If they graduated from high school in the U.S., but did not enroll in a U.S. college or university, four years have passed since their high school class graduated.
They have signed a contract with a professional basketball team not in the NBA, anywhere in the world, and have played under that contract.

Players who meet the criteria for "international" players are automatically eligible if they meet any of the following criteria:
They are at least 22 years old during the calendar year of the draft. In terms of dates, players born on or before December 31, 1998 are automatically eligible for the 2020 draft.
They have signed a contract with a professional basketball team not in the NBA within the United States, and have played under that contract.

See also 
 List of first overall NBA draft picks

References

External links
Official site
How scouting for the NBA Draft was done during the pandemic

Draft
National Basketball Association draft
NBA Draft
NBA Draft
Basketball in Connecticut
Events in Hartford County, Connecticut
NBA Draft
Bristol, Connecticut